KMGK, also known as Smooth Magic 107.1, is a radio station with a Soft Gold format based in Glenwood, Minnesota owned by Branstock Communications. Smooth Magic 107 plays "smooth" songs from the 1950s to the 1990s. The signal reaches to Alexandria, Minnesota and Sauk Centre, Minnesota, where the station targets programming to.

History

Smooth Magic 107 (JRN)
From March 2005, until September 30, 2008, KMGK aired a satellite feed (from Jones Radio Networks) called The Smooth Jazz Station.  The format was discontinued as part of the integration into the Dial Global brand.

Magic 107 (JRN)
Up until March 2005, Magic 107 aired an Adult Contemporary format from the satellite feed from Jones Radio Network

Sports coverage
KMGK provides coverage of some high school sporting events for Minnewaska Area High School, Osakis High School, Alexandria and Belgrade-Brooten-Elrosa High School. KMGK hosts a radio talk  called Coaches Round-up, a show featuring interviews of area high school coaches. It also is a part of the Minnesota Twins Radio Network.
Smooth Magic 107 is a Gopher Radio affiliate and carries University of Minnesota Football and Men's basketball as well as occasional Gopher Men's hockey and Women's basketball. KMGK also recently carried NDSU [North Dakota State] Bison football.

External links
Smooth Magic 107 official website

Radio stations in Alexandria, Minnesota
Oldies radio stations in the United States